Afzelin is a flavonol glycoside. It is the rhamnoside of kaempferol.  It is found in Nymphaea odorata.

References 

Kaempferol glycosides
Flavonoid rhamnosides